Jason Agius is an Australian actor of mixed-Mediterranean descent, best known as Nikos Aristides in Newton's Law, alongside Claudia Karvan, Toby Schmitz and Sean Keenan.

Career 
In 2012, Agius made his television debut in Southern Star's Tangle, playing a 'Fighter Mate' of Lincoln Younes's Romeo. He then appeared in a myriad of television pilots and short films, including Penny, alongside The Saddle Club alum Lara Jean Marshall.

Agius made his feature film debut in AACTA nominated The Death and Life of Otto Bloom (dir. Cris Jones), alongside Xavier Samuel and 3x Golden Globe nominee Rachel Ward, and produced by Mish Armstrong, Alicia Brown and Oscar winning producer Melanie Coombs. Otto Bloom was selected to open the 65th Melbourne International Film Festival in 2016. Soon after, Agius auditioned and was ultimately cast in Newton's Law.

In May 2018, Agius appeared in the ABC comedy documentary Corey White's Roadmap to Paradise in sketches related to the world's problems, as seen by comedian Corey White.

In 2022, Agius appeared as George in the Wog Boy sequel, Wog Boys Forever alongside Nick Giannopoulos. In the same year, it was announced that Agius had co-written feature film Little Europe with AFI-winning filmmaker Franco Di Chiera, and to be produced by Sabella Sugar. It is based on true events surrounding the Bonegilla Migrant Reception and Training Centre.

Selected filmography

References

External links

 

Living people
1994 births
Australian male television actors
Australian male film actors